Božinov or Bojinov is a south Slavic surname.

Notable people with the name include:

 Todor Božinov (born 1998), Macedonian basketball player
 Risto Božinov (born 1969), Macedonian football player
 Valeri Božinov (born 1986), Bulgarian football player

See also
 Božinović

Bulgarian-language surnames
Macedonian-language surnames